Mohammad Zahid is an Indian poet, translator and editor from Anantnag, Kashmir. He is a recipient of Jibanananda Das Award for his translation of Kashmiri poetry into English.

Early life and education
Mohammad Zahid was born in 1977 at Anantnag in Kashmir valley. His father Bashir Ahmad Makhdoomi and mother Badshah Gowher were scholars of English literature and Persian literature, respectively. Zahid had his early education in Anantnag and Srinagar. Later he joined Jammu & Kashmir Bank as an officer.

Professional and literary career
Despite being a banker by profession, Zahid has devoted his spare time to literature. His poetry has featured at International Library of Poetry, Florida and International Poetry Festival.  He has served as Editor of Muse India. He has also served as a feature photographer for various journals like Lake View International Journal for Literature and Arts and translator editor for several other journals.  His poetry has been translated into French, Spanish and other world languages. His maiden poetry book “The Pheromone Trail” won the best book award from the Jammu and Kasmhir Academy of Art, Culture and Language.  His English poems essentially captures the “illusion of fantasies that has enamoured Kashmiri people”.  He has also translated Kashmiri poetry into English including Sahitya Akademi award winning works of Naseem Shafaie.

Awards and recognitions
 Jibanananda Das Award
 Best Book Award from Academy of Art, Culture & Language
 Reliance Time-Out Poetry Award 
 Sacred Heart Poetry Prize

Bibliography
The Pheromone Trail (2017)

See also
 Naseem Shafaie

References 

1977 births
Living people
Indian male poets
21st-century Indian poets
Indian translators
People from Anantnag
Jibanananda Das Award